Ginel, Ginell, or Ginnell may refer to:

Alicia Homs Ginel (born 1993), Spanish politician
Salvador Ginel (born 1938), Argentine former footballer
Laurence Ginnell (1854–1923), Irish nationalist politician
Pat Ginnell (1937–2003), Canadian professional ice hockey player

See also
Ginnel, or alley